The Gazette Building in downtown Little Rock, Arkansas was built in 1908.  It was designed by architect George R. Mann, and built by Peter Hotze.  The building was listed on the U.S. National Register of Historic Places in 1976. Originally and for many years, the building served as the headquarters of the Arkansas Gazette newspaper. After the Gazette was sold and became the Arkansas Democrat-Gazette, the building served as the national campaign headquarters for the 1992 presidential campaign of Governor Bill Clinton.  It now houses the Elementary and Middle Schools for eStem Public Charter Schools.

See also
National Register of Historic Places listings in Little Rock, Arkansas

References

Commercial buildings on the National Register of Historic Places in Arkansas
Commercial buildings completed in 1908
Buildings and structures in Little Rock, Arkansas
Newspaper headquarters in the United States
National Register of Historic Places in Little Rock, Arkansas
1908 establishments in Arkansas